WLGS-LP (101.5 FM) is a radio station licensed to serve the community of Lake Villa, Illinois. The station is owned by Calvary Chapel of Lake Villa. It airs a Contemporary Christian music format, along with locally and nationally produced Christian talk and teaching programs. The station is also heard in eastern Lake County through a translator at 99.9 FM, W260BL in Waukegan, Illinois.

The station was assigned the call sign WCLV-LP by the Federal Communications Commission on January 15, 2004. The station changed its call sign to WLGS-LP on February 20, 2004.

Translator

References

External links
 Official Website
 

LGS-LP
Radio stations established in 2005
2005 establishments in Illinois
Contemporary Christian radio stations in the United States
Lake County, Illinois
LGS-LP